The 1984 Taranto Open was a tennis tournament played on outdoor clay courts in Taranto, Italy that was part of the 1984 Virginia Slims World Championship Series. The tournament was held from 23 April until 29 April 1984. Sandra Cecchini won the singles title.

Finals

Singles
 Sandra Cecchini defeated  Sabrina Goleš 6–2, 7–5
 It was Cecchini's 1st career title.

Doubles
 Sabrina Goleš /  Petra Huber defeated  Elena Eliseenko /  Natasha Reva 6–3, 6–3
 It was Goleš's 1st career title. It was Huber's 1st career title.

References

Taranto Open
Ilva Trophy
1984 in Italian tennis